Biobank ethics refers to the ethics pertaining to all aspects of biobanks. The issues examined in the field of biobank ethics are special cases of clinical research ethics.

Overview of issues
The following table shows many of the leading controversial issues related to biobanking. The table names an issue, then describes a point on which there is consensus and an aspect of that same point for which there is no consensus.

Privacy for research participants

There is broad consensus that when a person donates a specimen for research then that person has a right to privacy thereafter.  To this end, researchers balance the need for specimens to be anonymous or de-identified from protected health information with the need to have access to data about the specimen so that researchers can use the sample without knowing the identity of the donor. In the United States, for example, the Office for Human Research Protections often promotes a traditional system wherein data which could identify a participant is coded, and then elsewhere stored away from the data is key which could decipher the identities in special circumstances when required outside of usual research.

Complications arise in many situations, such as when the identity of the donor is released anyway or when the researchers want to contact the donor of the sample. Donor identities could become known if the data and decipher key are unsecure, but more likely, with rich datasets the identities of donors could be determined only from a few pieces of information which were thought unrelated to disturbing anonymity before the advent of computer communication.

Among the concerns which participants in biobanks have expressed are giving personal information to researchers and having data used against them somehow.

Scientists have demonstrated that in many cases where participants' names were removed from data, the data still contained enough information to make identification of the participants possible. This is because the historical methods of protecting confidentiality and anonymity have become obsolete when radically more detailed databases became available. Another problem is that even small amounts of genetic data, such as a record of 100 single nucleotide polymorphisms, can uniquely identify anyone.

There have been problems deciding what safeguards should be in place for storing medical research data. In response, some researchers have made efforts to describe what constitutes sufficient security and to recognize what seemingly anonymized information can be used to identify donors.

Ownership of specimens
When a person donates a specimen to a researcher, it is not easy to describe what the participant is donating because ownership of the specimen represents more rights than physical control over the specimen.

The specimens themselves have commercial value, and research products made from specimens can also.  Fundamental research benefits all sectors, including government, non-profit, and commercial, and these sectors will not benefit equally.  Specimens may be subject to biological patenting or research results from specimen experimentation may lead to the development of products which some entity will own.  The extent to which a specimen donor should be able to restrict the way their specimen is used is a matter of debate.

Some researchers make the argument that the specimens and data should be publicly owned.  Other researchers say that by calling for donations and branding the process as altruistic the entities organizing biobank research are circumventing difficult ethical questions which participants and researchers ought to address.

Return of results

There is broad consensus that participants in clinical research have a right to know the results of a study in which they participated so that they can check the extent to which their participation delivered beneficial results to their community. The right to justice in the Belmont Report is a part of this idea. Despite the consensus that researchers should return some information to communities, there is no universally recognized authoritative policy on how researchers should return results to communities, and the views and practices of researchers in the field vary widely.

Returning results can be problematic for many reasons, such as increased difficulty of tracking participants who donated a sample as time passes, the conflict with the participant's right to privacy, the inability of researchers to meaningfully explain scientific results to participants, general disinterest of participants to study results, and deciding what constitutes a return of results.

If genetic testing is done, then researches may get health information about participants, but in many cases there is no plan in place for giving participants information derived from their samples.

Informed consent

Because donating a specimen involves consideration of many issues, different people will have different levels of understanding of what they are doing when they donate a specimen.  Since it is difficult to explain every issue to everyone, problems of giving informed consent arise when researchers take samples.

A special informed consent problem happened historically with biobanks. Previous to the advent of biobanks, researchers would ask specimen donors for consent to participate in a single study, and give participants information about that study. In a biobank system, a researcher may have many specimens collected over many years and then long after the donors gave the sample, that researcher may want to conduct a new study using those samples but have no good way to give donors information about that study and collect their consent. This problem was first identified in widespread publication in 1995 when an article on this topic was published.

Many people have the opportunity to donate samples to medical research in the course of their regular medical care, but there are ethical problems in having one's own doctor request specimens.  Most participants are willing to provide consent for biospecimens and disease specific or related biobanks are favorable. Donors to biobanks frequently do not have a good understanding of the concept of a biobank or the implications of donating a specimen to one. Researchers support biobanking despite risk to participants because the benefit is high, it pays respect to people's wishes to involve themselves in research, current practices and culture support this kind of research, and consensus is that the risk of participation is low.

References

Biobanks
Medical ethics
Research ethics
Bioethics